1430 Somalia, provisional designation , is a stony background asteroid from the central regions of the asteroid belt, approximately 10 kilometers in diameter. It was discovered on 5 July 1937, by astronomer Cyril Jackson at the Union Observatory in Johannesburg. It was named for the African country of Somalia.

Orbit and classification 

Based on the hierarchical clustering method, Somalia is a non-family asteroid of the main belt's background population (Nesvorný), as well as a core member of the Astraea family (Milani and Knežević). It orbits the Sun in the central asteroid belt at a distance of 2.1–3.1 AU once every 4 years and 1 month (1,495 days). Its orbit has an eccentricity of 0.20 and an inclination of 3° with respect to the ecliptic.

The body's observation arc begins with its official discovery observation at Johannesburg in 1937.

Physical characteristics 

Somalia is an assumed stony S-type asteroid.

Lightcurves 

In 2011, two rotational lightcurves of Somalia were obtained from photometric observations by French amateur astronomer René Roy, and by astronomers at the Bassano Bresciano Observatory in Italy. Lightcurve analysis gave a rotation period of 6.910 and 6.913 hours with a brightness amplitude of 0.40 and 0.45 magnitude, respectively.

In 2016, a modeled lightcurve was derived from various photometric database sources, giving a concurring sidereal period of 6.90907 hours. The modelled lightcurve also determined two spin axis of (297.0°, 42.0°) and (128.0°, 47.0°) in ecliptic coordinates.

Diameter and albedo 

According to the surveys carried out by the Japanese Akari satellite and the NEOWISE mission of NASA's Wide-field Infrared Survey Explorer, Somalia measures between 8.77 and 9.674 kilometers in diameter and its surface has an albedo between 0.1436 and 0.31.

The Collaborative Asteroid Lightcurve Link assumes a standard albedo for stony asteroids of 0.20 and calculates a diameter of 10.79 kilometers based on an absolute magnitude of 12.2.

Naming 

This minor planet was named after the country of Somalia, located in the Horn of Africa. The official naming citation was published by the Minor Planet Center on 1 February 1980.

References

External links 
 Asteroid Lightcurve Database (LCDB), query form (info )
 Dictionary of Minor Planet Names, Google books
 Asteroids and comets rotation curves, CdR – Observatoire de Genève, Raoul Behrend
 Discovery Circumstances: Numbered Minor Planets (1)-(5000) – Minor Planet Center
 
 

001430
Discoveries by Cyril Jackson (astronomer)
Named minor planets
19370705